Mesosaurus (meaning "middle lizard") is an extinct genus of reptile from the Early Permian of southern Africa and South America. Along with it, the genera Brazilosaurus and Stereosternum, it is a member of the family Mesosauridae and the order Mesosauria. Mesosaurus was long thought to have been one of the first marine reptiles, although new data suggests that at least those of Uruguay inhabited a hypersaline water body, rather than a typical marine environment. In any case, it had many adaptations to a fully aquatic lifestyle. It is usually considered to have been anapsid, although Friedrich von Huene considered it to be a synapsid, and this hypothesis has been revived recently.

Discovery and naming
The holotype of M. tenuidens, MNHN 1865-77, is nicknamed the "Griqua Mesosaurus" and it was found in a Griqua hut in South Africa, likely in Kimberley, Northern Cape around 1830 and was being used as a pot lid. The circumstances of its discovery and how it was taken from its previous owners in South Africa are unknown, but what is known is that the specimen eventually surfaced in the collection of the French palaeontologist Paul Gervais during the 1860s and he designated it as the holotype of a new genus and species he named Mesosaurus tenuidens in 1865.

Since then, Mesosaurus remains have also been identified from South America and were first identified in 1908 as belonging to a second species, M. brasiliensis, by J. H. MacGregor. Later studies have shown that M. brasiliensis was the same animal as M. tenuidens, which remains as the single valid species of Mesosaurus to this day.

Two other species of mesosaurids have since been described, which are Stereosternum and Brazilosaurus, which are also considered to be synonyms of Mesosaurus tenuidens according to Piñeiro et al. (2021).

Description 
Mesosaurus had a long skull that was larger than that of Stereosternum and had longer teeth. The teeth are angled outwards, especially those at the tips of the jaws.

The bones of the postcranial skeleton are thick, having undergone pachyostosis. Mesosaurus is unusual among reptiles in that it possesses a cleithrum. A cleithrum is a type of dermal bone that overlies the scapula, and is usually found in more primitive bony fish and tetrapods. The head of the interclavicle of Mesosaurus is triangular, unlike those of other early reptiles, which are diamond-shaped.

Palaeobiology 
Mesosaurus was one of the first reptiles known to have returned to the water after early tetrapods came to land in the Late Devonian or later in the Paleozoic. It probably propelled itself through the water with its long hind legs and flexible tail. Its body was also flexible and could easily move sideways, but it had heavily thickened ribs, which would have prevented it from twisting its body.

Mesosaurus had a small skull with long jaws. The nostrils were located at the top, allowing the creature to breathe with only the upper side of its head breaking the surface, in a similar manner to a modern crocodile. The teeth were originally thought to have been straining devices for the filter feeding of planktonic organisms. However, this idea was based on the assumption that the teeth of Mesosaurus were numerous and close together in the jaws. Newly examined remains of Mesosaurus show that it had fewer teeth and that the dentition was suitable for catching small nektonic prey such as crustaceans.

The pachyostosis seen in the bones of Mesosaurus may have enabled it to reach neutral buoyancy in the upper few meters of the water column. The additional weight may have stabilized the animal at the water's surface. Alternatively, it could have given Mesosaurus greater momentum when gliding underwater. While many features suggest a wholly aquatic lifestyle, Mesosaurus may have been able to move onto land for short periods of time. Its elbows and ankles were restricted in their movement, making walking appear impossible. It is more likely that if Mesosaurus moved onto land, it would push itself forward in a similar way to living female sea turtles when nesting on beaches.

Clearly amniote-type fossil embryos of Mesosaurus in an advanced stage of development (i.e. fetuses) have been discovered in Uruguay and Brazil. These fossils are the earliest record of amniote fetuses, although amniotes are inferred to have had their typical reproductive strategy since their first appearance in the Late Carboniferous. Prior to their description, the oldest known amniote fetuses were from the Triassic. One isolated coiled fetus called FC-DPV 2504 is not surrounded by calcareous eggshells, suggesting that the glands in the oviduct of Mesosaurus and probably all Paleozoic amniotes were not able to secrete calcium carbonate, in contrast to post-paleozoic archosaurs. This would explain the scarcity of egg fossils in the paleozoic amniote fossil record. One Mesosaurus specimen called MCN-PV 2214 comprises a medium-size adult with a small individual in its rib cage which is interpreted as a fetus ‘in utero’, even suggesting that Mesosaurus like many other marine reptiles, gave live birth. If this interpretation is correct, this specimen would represent the earliest known example of viviparity in the fossil record. The isolated fetus FC-DPV 2504, however, rather points to an ovoviviparous reproduction strategy in Mesosaurus.

A study on vertebral column proportions suggested that, while young Mesosaurus might have been fully aquatic, adult animals spent some time on land. This is supported by the rarity of adult animals in aquatic settings, and a coprolite possessing drying fractures. However, how terrestrial these animals were is difficult to say, as their pachyostosis and other adaptations for an aquatic lifestyle would have made foraging on land difficult.

Distribution 
Mesosaurus was significant in providing evidence for the theory of continental drift, because its remains were found in southern Africa, Whitehill Formation, and eastern South America (Melo Formation, Uruguay and Irati Formation, Brazil), two widely separated regions. As Mesosaurus was a coastal animal, and therefore less likely to have crossed the Atlantic Ocean, this distribution indicated that the two continents used to be joined together.

Gallery

References

Further reading 

 Parker, Steve. Dinosaurus: the complete guide to dinosaurs. Firefly Books Inc, 2003. Pg. 90
 
 
 
 

Prehistoric marine reptiles
Prehistoric reptile genera
Permian reptiles of Africa
Fossils of Namibia
Fossils of South Africa
Permian reptiles of South America
Permian Brazil
Fossils of Brazil
Permian Uruguay
Fossils of Uruguay
Paraná Basin
Fossil taxa described in 1865
Taxa named by Paul Gervais